The 1991 CECAFA Cup was the 18th edition of the tournament. It was held in Uganda, and was won by Zambia. The matches were played between November 23 – December 7.

Group stage

Group A

Group B

Knockout stage

Semi-finals

Third place match

Final

References
Rsssf archive

CECAFA Cup
International association football competitions hosted by Uganda
CECAFA